Conrad Grebel University College is a university college affiliated with the University of Waterloo in Waterloo, Ontario, Canada. It is affiliated with the Mennonite Church Canada. 

The college is named after Conrad Grebel, a co-founder of the Swiss Brethren movement who is called the "Father of Anabaptists".

History
Starting in the late 1950s, discussions among Harvey W. Taves (Director of the Canadian office of the Mennonite Central Committee) and others occurred with the purpose of establishing a college undergirded by the peace commitment of the Mennonite church. Following the founding of Conrad Grebel College in 1963, Taves served as secretary of the board for several years. In 2001, it has become a university.

An Act respecting Conrad Grebel University College was assented to June 24, 2004.

Facilities
Grebel (pronounced "Grey-bull") is located next to the University of Waterloo and offers residence and classes for students. The facility has residences for 142 students, as well as apartments for an additional 32 students.

Ensembles
Many music ensembles are run by the Conrad Grabel University College, including: Orchestra @UWaterloo, instrumental chamber ensembles, jazz ensemble, Balinese gamelan ensemble, and choirs. These ensembles are open to students in the music programs or those outside of the College.

Scholarships and bursaries
The Government of Canada sponsors an Aboriginal Bursaries Search Tool that lists over 680 scholarships, bursaries, and other incentives offered by governments, universities, and industry to support Aboriginal post-secondary participation. Conrad Grebel University College scholarships for Aboriginal, First Nations and Métis students include: Sundance Aboriginal Student Award

Media
The college runs the Conrad Grebel Review, a peer-reviewed journal of Christian inquiry  from broadly-based Anabaptist/Mennonite perspectives. It is published three times a year.

Relationship with the University of Waterloo
All students at Conrad Grebel, and all of the other university colleges surrounding the central university, are registered at, take classes at, and graduate from the University of Waterloo.  Specialized classes are available from Conrad Grebel, which has an academic focus on Music, Peace and Conflict Studies, Religious Studies, and Mennonite Studies.  Courses from Grebel may be taken by any University of Waterloo student, and are taught by Grebel professors at the Grebel college, but count as credit at the University of Waterloo.

Community

Conrad Grebel University college places a strong emphasis on community.  This is both a reflection of founding Mennonite values and of the small size of the college.  Because of Grebel's small size (at most 142 residence students, 32 Apartment residents per term in addition to a number of associates) and emphasis on providing room for upper year students, most of the students know most of the other students in residence.  Relationships with others are encouraged through Snack Nights, regular chapel services, and a weekly Community Supper at which the entire residence community, as well as some associate students and faculty and staff gather for a more formal dinner. Conrad Grebel University College is also affiliated with the Inter-Mennonite Children's Choir.

See also

 Higher education in Ontario
 List of universities in Ontario
 Canadian Interuniversity Sport
 Canadian government scientific research organizations
 Canadian university scientific research organizations
 Canadian industrial research and development organizations
 List of colleges and universities named after people

References

Books
Kenneth McLaughlin 'Waterloo: The Unconventional Founding of an Unconventional University' (Waterloo: University of Waterloo Press © 1997)
Kenneth McLaughlin 'Out of the Shadow of Orthodoxy: Waterloo @ 50' (Waterloo: University of Waterloo Press © 2007)
Brian McKillop, 'Matters of Mind: The University in Ontario, 1791-1951' (Ottawa: University of Ottawa Press ©1951)

External links

 Official website
 Conrad Grebel University College in Global Anabaptist Mennonite Encyclopedia Online

Seminaries and theological colleges in Canada
Universities and colleges affiliated with the Mennonite Church
1963 establishments in Ontario
Mennonite schools in Canada
University of Waterloo buildings
Mennonitism in Ontario